The Brașov metropolitan area is a metropolitan area in Brașov County, Romania, that includes the municipality of Brașov and 12 other nearby communities. It was constituted in 2007 with the aim of creating business opportunities, building and administering of living spaces and recreational areas, to attract more consistent investment, and to coordinate better environment and infrastructure projects. As of 2011, the area has a population of 369,896. The total area is 1,368.5 km².

As defined by Eurostat, the Brașov functional urban area has a population of 398,953 residents.

Localities
Municipalities: Brașov, Codlea, Săcele
Cities: Ghimbav, Predeal, Râșnov
Communes: Cristian, Sânpetru, Hălchiu, Tărlungeni, Prejmer, Bod, and Hărman

Statistics

References

External links
 
 
 https://web.archive.org/web/20071018062913/http://judbrasov.ro/public/index.php?level0=cj
 http://www.bzb.ro/index.php?page_name=stire_detalii&id_stire=35816

Geography of Brașov County
Metropolitan areas of Romania